Rødovre Municipality has in its history been a strong area for parties of the red bloc. In the 2019 Danish general election, it would become the municipality where the bloc received the 4th highest % of votes. Ever since 1952 the Social Democrats had also held the mayor's position.

In the 2017 election, the Social Democrats had won an absolute majority, and this led to Erik Nielsen becoming mayor, which he had been since 1994.

In January 2020, it was revealed that Erik Nielsen would step down as mayor, and Britt Jensen, from the same party, would take over.

In this election, the Social Democrats would lose it's absolute majority, but would still remain the largest party. Only 5 parties won representation, and 13 of the seats was for parties of the red bloc. Britt Jensen would eventually find a majority and she would therefore continue as mayor.

Electoral system
For elections to Danish municipalities, a number varying from 9 to 31 are chosen to be elected to the municipal council. The seats are then allocated using the D'Hondt method and a closed list proportional representation.
Rødovre Municipality had 19 seats in 2021

Unlike in Danish General Elections, in elections to municipal councils, electoral alliances are allowed.

Electoral alliances  

Electoral Alliance 1

Electoral Alliance 2

Results

Notes

References 

Rødovre